Henry Onderdonk Floyd-Jones (January 3, 1792 — December 20, 1862) was an American politician from New York.

Life
He was born at the family mansion on the Fort Neck estate in South Oyster Bay, New York (then Queens, now Nassau County) as the son of David Richard Floyd-Jones (1764–1826) and Sarah (Onderdonk) Floyd-Jones (1758–1844). He married Helen Watts (1792–1872), and they had several children, among them State Senator Edward Floyd-Jones (1823–1901) and Col. DeLancey Floyd-Jones (1826–1902).

He was a member of the New York State Assembly (Queens Co.) in 1829 and 1830.

He was a member of the New York State Senate (1st D.) from 1836 to 1839, sitting in the 59th, 60th, 61st and 62nd New York State Legislatures.

Lt. Gov. David R. Floyd-Jones (1813–1871) was his nephew; Bishop William H. DeLancey (1797–1865) and Susan DeLancey, the wife of James Fenimore Cooper (1789–1851), were his first cousins.

Sources
The New York Civil List compiled by Franklin Benjamin Hough (pages 130ff, 142, 208 and 284; Weed, Parsons and Co., 1858)
 Floyd-Jones family
Memorial of the Hon. David S. Jones (1849; pg. 97ff)
Sarah Floyd-Jones obit of his daughter, in NYT on August 12, 1900

External links

Guide to the Watts-Jones Family Papers, 1800-1905

1792 births
1862 deaths
Democratic Party New York (state) state senators
People from Massapequa, New York
Democratic Party members of the New York State Assembly
19th-century American politicians